The women's Individual competition of the modern pentathlon events at the 2011 Pan American Games was held on October 15 at the Hipica Club. The defending Pan American Games and the Pan American Championship, champion was Yane Marques of Brazil.

The top placing athlete from North America and South America along with the two other athletes not already qualified  awarded spots to compete at the 2012 Summer Olympics in London, Great Britain. The two spots was assigned to the two best placed not already qualified irrespective of region.

Margaux Isaksen of the United States was the Pan American champion.

Format
For the first time at a Pan American Games, the modern pentathlon events will introduce laser shooting (as opposed to pistol shooting) and a combined shooting/running event. Athletes will compete first in epée fencing followed by swimming the 200 metre freestyle, thirdly in equestrian (jumping) and finally in the combined shooting/running event. The athlete that crosses the line first wins.

Schedule

Results

References

Modern pentathlon at the 2011 Pan American Games